Johan Frederik Knudzen Nødbæk (25 August 1787, Holum – 26 February 1871, Holum) was a Norwegian politician.

He was elected to the Norwegian Parliament in 1842 and 1845, representing the rural constituency of Lister og Mandals Amt (today named Vest-Agder). He worked as a farmer.

References

1787 births
1871 deaths
Members of the Storting
Vest-Agder politicians
People from Mandal, Norway